Mary Margaret O'Hara's Christmas EP was released in 1991. It collects three covers of classic Christmas standards, as well as an original Christmas-themed song written by O'Hara.

Track listing
 "Blue Christmas" (4:59)
 "Silent Night" (3:57)
 "What Are You Doing New Year's Eve?" (3:13)
 "Christmas Evermore" (4:16)

1991 EPs
Mary Margaret O'Hara albums
1991 Christmas albums
Christmas EPs
Christmas albums by Canadian artists
Rock Christmas albums